Elizabeth Merrill Welch (born September 20, 1970) is an American lawyer from Michigan currently serving as an Associate Justice of the Michigan Supreme Court.

Education 

Welch received her Bachelor of Arts from Pennsylvania State University and her Juris Doctor from the Ohio State University Moritz College of Law.

Legal career 

Welch has been practicing law in Michigan and Ohio since 1995, she later opened up her own practice in Michigan in 2004.

Michigan Supreme Court 

Welch was nominated as a candidate for the Michigan Supreme Court by the Michigan Democratic Party. Welch ran for the seat being vacated by Justice Stephen Markman whose term was expiring. On November 3, 2020, Welch went on to win the general election, giving the Michigan Supreme Court a Democratic majority.

Personal life 

Welch lives in East Grand Rapids with her husband, Brian; they have 4 children.

References

External links 

1970 births
Living people
20th-century American lawyers
21st-century American judges
21st-century American lawyers
20th-century American women lawyers
Justices of the Michigan Supreme Court
Michigan Democrats
Michigan lawyers
Ohio State University Moritz College of Law alumni
Pennsylvania State University alumni
People from Grand Rapids, Michigan
21st-century American women judges